Shah Mosque may refer to:

 Shah Mosque (Isfahan), also known as the New Abbasi Mosque or Royal Mosque, in Isfahan, Iran
Shah Mosque (Mashhad), a mosque in Mashhad
 Shah Mosque (Tehran),  also known as the Soltāni Mosque, in Tehran, Iran